30 Days of Night: Blood Trails is a 2007 American 7-part horror miniseries that was released on FEARnet.com and FEARnet On Demand that acts as a prequel to the films 30 Days of Night and 30 Days of Night: Dark Days. Set two days before the events in the first film, the series focuses on George (Andrew Laurich), a young addict who makes a living seeking covert information for Judith, the weary but wise New Orleans, Louisiana vampire hunter. It is based on a subplot of the original comic that was left out of the film.

Plot
In New Orleans, a man named George covered in blood running towards a policeman who subdues and begins to arrest him when George ignores his commands to stop.

Two days earlier, George is going to see Judith for one last job. George is a recovering addict and he is hoping to use the money from the job to leave New Orleans and start a new life with his girlfriend Jenny. He goes to meet Eddie behind a bar, collect a CD and deliver it to Pat. Yet, when he arrives, Eddie has been attacked and the disc destroyed. Eddie, barely alive, uses his bloody finger to scrawl some letters and numbers on George's forearm before he dies.

In the background, a vampire runs past George, who flees into the bar Eddie had come from. However, indoors he runs into his old dealer who wants payment for the drugs. George is then water tortured in the bathroom until the vampire kills the dealer. Not wanting to stay long, George runs to Pat's apartment with the code. Pat sends the code to Cynthia in Los Angeles. Feeling that his job is done George heads back to his place. As Pat is about to hack into a website, he witnesses Cynthia on a webcam being beheaded by another vampire.

George returns to his apartment to find Jenny upset and in withdrawal. George feels he has been followed and hides with Jenny in the closet. A vampire has followed George to his apartment and now is looking for him. George uses a nailbat to attack and escape from the vampire. Confused, they both run to see Pat, only to find him bleeding to death. He asks George to deliver a message to Judith and begs George to kill him. When he hesitates, Pat becomes a vampire, only to have Jenny behead him with a katana. Wanting answers, they head for Judith who tells them to take the message to Chad.

They arrive at Chad's with the message. Written in a hidden code, Chad needs time to crack it. While waiting outside, George and Jenny talk about what they will do after Cynthia pays him. Suddenly, Jenny is pulled backward into a below-ground alley by a vampire. George follows and finds her bleeding and transforming into a vampire. She attacks him, and he is forced to kill Jenny with a length of pipe. He goes back into the building only to find a bloody stump of Chad's arm, clutching a piece of paper on which the decoded message is written.

After reading the message, George runs into the street. We come back to when George is being arrested and discovers the message reveals the vampires' plan – a "feeding" in Barrow, Alaska (now Utqiagvik), which will take place the following night.

Cast
 Trip Hope as Eddie
 Tiffany Barrett as Vampire 3
 Perry Cornelius as Police Officer
 Marilyn Johnson as Judith Ali
 Brittney Kara	as Kate
 Andrew Laurichas as George Fowler
 Dani Owen as Jenny
 Patrick Logan Pace as Vampire 1
 Jeremy Shranko as Luis
 Shawn G. Smitha as Cal
 Geoff Stirling as Chad
 T.J. Zale as Pat

Release
Each clip was released on FEARnet.com and FEARnet On Demand between September 13 until October 18, a day before the movie premiered in theaters. The miniseries is available on FEAR.net, for those living within the United States, and on YouTube. On October 19 all 7 episodes were combined into a 30-minute film available On Demand.

The series was released on Region 2 DVD in the United Kingdom on April 14, 2008, to coincide with the release of the film 30 Days of Night on DVD and Blu-ray.

See also
Vampire film
List of vampire television series

References

30 Days of Night
2007 web series debuts
2007 web series endings
2000s American television miniseries
American horror fiction television series
Fiction set in 2007
Television series by Sony Pictures Television
Horror fiction web series
American drama web series
Prequel television series
Television shows based on comics
IDW Publishing adaptations
American vampire films
Vampires in television
Films directed by Víctor Garcia (Spanish director)